Benmore Gardens is a suburb of Johannesburg, South Africa. It is located in Region 3 and is in a South African region - some 29 mi (or 46 km) South-West of Pretoria, the country's capital city.

References

Johannesburg Region E